Cocconeis is a genus of diatoms. Members of the genus are elliptically shaped diatoms.

The green alga Cladophora is frequently covered with Cocconeis, as are individuals of Antarctic minke whales, often found with orange-brown to yellowish patches of Cocconeis ceticola on their bodies.

References 

 Riaux-Gobin, C. et al. 2014: Cocconeis pinnata W. Gregory ex Greville (Bacillariophyta): Lectotypification and an emended description after examination of type material and South Pacific specimens. Phytotaxa 156 (3), pages 81–99,

External links 
 
 
 

Diatom genera
Achnanthales
Taxa named by Christian Gottfried Ehrenberg